A junjung (or variously jung-jung, gungun, dyoung-dyoung etc.) is the royal war drum of the Serer people in Senegal and the Gambia. It was played on the way to the battlefield, on special state occasions as well as on Serer religious ceremonies. 

It is also the progenitor of the music of the same name found in the Caribbean.

See also
 Dunun

Notes

African drums
Battle drums
Serer royalty
Serer religion
Sacred musical instruments
Senegalese musical instruments
Gambian musical instruments